Joseph Samuel Toner (30 March 1894 – 18 November 1954) was an Irish professional footballer. He played eight times for the Ireland national team.

Career
Born in Castlewellan, County Down, Toner played for Belfast United before joining Arsenal in August 1919, making his debut for the side against Everton on 11 October 1919. An outside-left, he was a semi-regular in his first two seasons before breaking through properly in 1921–22. He won his first Ireland cap on 4 April 1922 against Wales in Belfast; the match finished 1-1. His second cap came a year later, again against Wales, this time at Wrexham.

By now he had been dropped by Arsenal; thanks to fierce competition for the outside left spot from Jimmy Paterson and Samson Haden, Toner only played eight games in total during 1922–23 and 1923–24. He became a regular again in 1924–25 before being dropped after Arsenal were given a 5–0 hiding at home to Huddersfield Town. He also won four more Ireland caps as an Arsenal player, before leaving to join St Johnstone in January 1926 after new Arsenal manager Herbert Chapman decided Toner wasn't part of his plans. In total he played exactly 100 times for Arsenal (89 in the league and 11 in the FA Cup), scoring six goals (all of them in the league).

After moving to Scotland, he won two further Ireland caps while with St Johnstone (the first player to represent the Perth club internationally), playing in the Home International games against England and Scotland in 1927. A broken leg forced him to retire, but he subsequently returned to Ireland and became a coach Coleraine, and on one occasion came out retirement to deputise in the side.

Toner also played hurling for his county and Gaelic football for Castlewellan GAC.

References

Northern Ireland Footballing Greats profile

1894 births
1954 deaths
People from County Down
Association football wingers
Association footballers from Northern Ireland
Pre-1950 IFA international footballers
Arsenal F.C. players
St Johnstone F.C. players
English Football League players
Scottish Football League players